Byers is an unincorporated town, a post office, and a census-designated place (CDP) located in and governed by Arapahoe County, Colorado, United States. The CDP is a part of the Denver–Aurora–Lakewood, CO Metropolitan Statistical Area. The Byers post office has the ZIP Code 80103. At the United States Census 2010, the population of the Byers CDP was 1,160, while the population of the 80103 ZIP Code Tabulation Area was 2,458 including adjacent areas.

History
The Byers Post Office has been in operation since 1873. The community took the name of William Byers, the first Colorado newspaper editor.

Geography

Climate

According to the Köppen Climate Classification system, Byers has a cold semi-arid climate, abbreviated "BSk" on climate maps.

Demographics

See also

Outline of Colorado
Index of Colorado-related articles
State of Colorado
Colorado cities and towns
Colorado census designated places
Colorado counties
Arapahoe County, Colorado
List of statistical areas in Colorado
Front Range Urban Corridor
North Central Colorado Urban Area
Denver-Aurora-Boulder, CO Combined Statistical Area
Denver-Aurora-Broomfield, CO Metropolitan Statistical Area

References

External links

Byers @ Colorado.com
Byers @ I-70 Corridor Chamber of Commerce
Byers School District
Arapahoe County Government website

Census-designated places in Arapahoe County, Colorado
Census-designated places in Colorado
Denver metropolitan area